Unión Cultural La Estrella is a football team based in Los Santos de Maimona in the autonomous community of Extremadura. Founded in 1968, it plays in Spanish 3rd Division.

Season to season

29 seasons in Tercera División

External links
Official website
Futbolme.com profile
fexfutbol.com profile

Football clubs in Extremadura
Association football clubs established in 1970
Divisiones Regionales de Fútbol clubs
1970 establishments in Spain
Province of Badajoz